Warwick Deacock (1926–2017) was a British soldier, mountaineer and adventurer.

Early life
Born in London, he joined the Royal Marines in 1943 and gained Commando Green Beret. Deacock left the Marines in 1947 and went on to do odd jobs to pay for sailing and climbing. In 1956, he joined the Special Air Service and served in Northern Malaya and Oman. He later resigned after realising the forces he fought in Oman were trained by the Central Intelligence Agency.

In 1959, Warwick Deacock migrated to Australia with his wife and daughter.

Ascent of Big Ben 
In 1963 Deacock went to Heard Island as a member of the Australian National Antarctic Research Expeditions. During the expedition, there was an attempt on climbing Big Ben to investigate glaciology, geology and volcanology of the unexplored area. Due to a prolonged blizzard and a lost food depot, the attempt was abandoned. One of the three members (Grahame Budd) had frostbitten hands but all survived. The three had lost their tent, sleeping bags and other equipment.

Back in Australia, Deacock drove around the country with his family working odd jobs. He decided to have another attempt at climbing Big Ben and in 1964 started fundraising for the attempt. In 8 months he raised nearly £86,000. Using this Deacock and four others went back to Heard Island and in January 1965, were the first to summit Big Ben.

Awards 

Royal Geographic Society J.P. Thompson Medal for Exploration in 1992
 Australian Geographic Society Adventurer of the Year Gold Medal in 1993
Order of Australia for services to conservation and the environment in 1997

References 

1926 births
2017 deaths
Place of death missing
Royal Marines personnel of World War II
Special Air Service soldiers
Military personnel from London
English emigrants to Australia
Australian mountain climbers
Members of the Order of Australia